Patoptoformis is a genus of moths belonging to the family Cossidae.

Description
The genus consists of small dark colored moths with dark hair densely covering the body. The antennae are bipectinate. Forewing with a scarcely seen streaky pattern; hindwing dark without
pattern; fringe evenly dark on both wings. Sexual dimorphism weakly expressed but female somewhat larger than male with wider wings and non-pectinate antennae.

Distribution
The genus consists of three species distributed in India (Assam), Nepal and south-eastern China
(Sichuan)

Species
Patoptoformis ganesha (Yakovlev, 2004)
Patoptoformis hanuman Yakovlev, 2006
Patoptoformis rimsaitae Saldaitis & Yakovlev, 2012

References

Cossinae